The 1986 Campeonato Nacional was Chilean football league top tier's 54th season. Colo-Colo was the tournament's champion, winning its fifteenth title.

League table

Results

Championship play-off

Topscorer

Liguilla Pre-Copa Libertadores

See also
1986 Copa Polla Lan Chile

References

External links 
ANFP 
RSSSF Chile 1986

Primera División de Chile seasons
Chile
Primera